Gaston Glass (born Jacques Gaston Oscar Glass; December 31, 1899 – November 11, 1965) was a French-American actor and film producer. He was the father of the composer Paul Glass (born 1934).

Selected filmography

 The Corsican Brothers (1917)
 Let's Elope (1919) - Darrell McKnight
 Oh, You Women! (1919) - Jimmy Johnson
 Open Your Eyes (1919)
 The Lost Battalion (1919) - Richard Merwin's Son
 The Woman of Lies (1919) - Tracy Norton
 Mothers of Men (1920) - Lt. Gerome De La Motte
 Humoresque (1920) - Leon Kantor (adult)
 The World and His Wife (1920) - Ernesto
 The Branded Woman (1920) - William Whitlock
 God's Crucible (1921) - Ivan Kalmar
 Her Winning Way (1921) - Harold Hargrave
 There Are No Villains (1921) - John King
 Cameron of the Royal Mounted (1921) - Cpl. Cameron
 The Song of Life (1922) - David Tilden
 Little Miss Smiles (1922) - Dr. Jack Washton
 Glass Houses (1922) - Billy Norton
 I Am the Law (1922) - Ralph Fitzgerald
 Rich Men's Wives (1922) - Juan Camillo
 Monte Cristo (1922) - Albert de Morcerf
 The Kingdom Within (1922) - Amos
 The Hero (1923) - Oswald Lane
 Gimme (1923) - Clinton Ferris
 The Spider and the Rose (1923) - Don Marcello
 The Girl Who Came Back (1923) - Ray Underhill
 Daughters of the Rich (1923) - Gerald Welden
 Mothers-in-Law (1923) - David Wingate
 The Midnight Flower (1923) - The Minister
 After the Ball (1924) - Arthur Trevelyan
 Trouping with Ellen (1924) - Andy Owens
 I Am the Man (1924) - Daniel Harrington
 Three Keys (1925) - George Lathrop
 The Mad Marriage (1925)
 Folly of Youth (1925) - Robert Cartwright
 Fair Play (1925) - Dickie Thane
 The Verdict (1925) - District Attorney
 Parisian Nights (1925) - Jacques
 The Danger Signal (1925) - Ralph Browning
 The Bad Lands (1925) - Hal Owen
 The Scarlet West (1925) - Capt. Howard
 The Price of Success (1925) - Wally
 Pursued (1925) - Dick Manning
 The Midnight Limited (1925) - Alan Bennett aka Alan Morse
 Broken Homes (1926) - John Merritt
 Things Wives Tell (1926) - Carl Burgess
 Wives at Auction (1926) - Mark Cameron
 Sweet Daddies (1926) - Sam Berkowitz
 The Call of the Klondike (1926) - Dick Norton
 The Romance of a Million Dollars (1926) - West MacDonald
 The Flying Fool (1926) - Jack Bryan
 Subway Sadie (1926) - Fred Perry
 Her Sacrifice (1926) - David Orland
 The Road to Broadway (1926) - John Worthington
 Tentacles of the North (1926) - Francis Wainfield
 The Jazz Girl (1926) - Rodneey Blake
 Exclusive Rights (1926) - Flash Fleming
 The Show Girl (1927) - Billy Barton
 The Love Wager (1927)
 Sinews of Steel (1927) - Robert McNeil Jr.
 False Morals (1927)
 Compassion (1927) - David Stanley
 Better Days (1927)
 The Gorilla (1927) - Marsden
 The Wife's Relations (1928) - Tom Powers
 My Home Town (1928) - David Warren
 Obey Your Husband (1928) - Arthur Reade
 Name the Woman (1928) - Joe Arnold
 A Gentleman Preferred (1928) - James Fargo
 The Red Mark (1928) - Bibi-Ri
 Broken Barriers (1928) - Charles Hill
 The Faker (1929) - Frank Clayton
 Geraldine (1929) - Bell Cameron
 Untamed Justice (1929) - Norman Bard, Air Mail Pilot
 Behind Closed Doors (1929) - Fred Baher
 Tiger Rose (1929) - Pierre
 A Woman's Justice (1930)
 Lopez, le bandit (1930) - Robert
 Just Like Heaven (1930) - Jean
 She Got What She Wanted (1930) - Boris
 The Big Trail (1931) - Pierre Calmine
 Lottery Lover (1935) - Andre (uncredited)
 Becky Sharp (1935) - British Officer (uncredited)
 The Man Who Broke the Bank at Monte Carlo (1935) - Minor Role (uncredited)
 Escape from Devil's Island (1935) - Sergeant (uncredited)
 Sylvia Scarlett (1935) - Purser (uncredited)
 Custer's Last Stand (1936, Serial) - Joe - Bartender (uncredited)
 Two in the Dark (1936) - Hotel Waiter (uncredited)
 Desire (1936) - Second Jewelry Clerk (uncredited)
 Sutter's Gold (1936) - Lt. Bacalenakoff (uncredited)
 Give Us This Night (1936) - Usher (uncredited)
 The Clutching Hand (1936) - Louis Bouchard
 Under Two Flags (1936) - Adjutant (uncredited)
 Fatal Lady (1936) - Brazilian Opera Troupe (uncredited)
 The Princess Comes Across (1936) - Photographer (uncredited)
 Hearts Divided (1936) - Napoleon's Secretary (uncredited)
 Mary of Scotland (1936) - Frenchman
 Gambling with Souls (1936) - Drunk Man in Bar
 Death in the Air (1936) - Lt. Rene La Rue
 Espionage (1937) - La Forge
 The King and the Chorus Girl (1937) - Junior Officer (uncredited)
 Paris After Dark (1943) - Soldier (uncredited)

References

External links

Gaston Glass at Virtual History

1899 births
1965 deaths
American male film actors
American male silent film actors
French male film actors
French male silent film actors
20th-century French male actors
French emigrants to the United States
20th-century American male actors